Maria Dinulescu (born 2 May 1981 in Ploieşti) is a Romanian actress.

Acting career

Maria Dinulescu studied acting at the National University of Cinema and Drama in Bucharest, Romania. She came to international attention in 2003, when one of the first shorts she played in, "Traffic", won the Palme d'Or in Cannes. She came back to Cannes in 2007, as the lead female actress in the full-feature "California Dreamin' (endless)," the winner of the "Un Certain Regard" section. Her performance in this movie won her a few other awards including the Best Actress Prize at BIAF Georgia and Arte Mare from France.
 
Maria subsequently played the lead role in "Hooked", a film that had its world premiere at the 65th Venice film Festival. Her performance in "Hooked" was described as "bewitching" (Hollywood Reporter) and "bubbly (in a difficult role)" (Variety) and was rewarded with the Best Actress Prize at the Thessaloniki Film Festival and the Buenos Aires Film Festival.

Of the 12 full-length feature films that Maria has starred in, she has played the lead 7 times. She also has several television credits, including the HBO-produced Romanian version of the "In Treatment" HBO series. She has acted in more than 10 successful short films, commercials, and was the lead in the music video, "Peace" by Depeche Mode. In 2010, Dinulescu won the Esquire Magazine, Sexiest Woman Alive Atlas, 2010 for Romania.

She moved to Los Angeles where she studied at UCLA,  Groundlings Theatre & School and she participate in many laboratory and workshops with prestigious actors, directors and teachers. Maria played in different short movies for USC and  New York Film Academy students. "Stepping Out" brought her the award for best actress at Los Angeles  Indie Film Fest 2014.

Maria has a master in Japanese theater and culture, is member of European Film Academy and speaks Romanian, English and Italian. 
 
What others have to say about Maria:

 Jay Weissberg (Variety), met Ms. Dinulescu at Cannes in 2007 and he writes:

". . .it is very rare that jaded critics stand up and take notice, but quite a number of us remarked at the time that Dinulescu was an actress to watch."

 "She has chosen roles wisely and has been fortunate in that several films she has starred in have been screened at the world's most important festivals, including Cannes, Venice and Toronto. This exposure has broadened her name recognition far beyond Romania's borders, and she is currently one of the most recognizable and watched actresses in the Romanian film industry – an industry, I should add, whose extraordinary renaissance in recent years has meant that every major International film festival actively seeks out Romanian films for their roster."

Yale University Professor, David Chambers, states:

"As an actress, Maria Dinulescu is uncommonly protean, absolutely distinct and different in each role she plays. Her range of abilities as an actress is simply astounding: here a beguiling gamine, there an androgynous mystery woman, next a rebellious fury, then a delightfully comic trickster with a twinkle in her eye."

Columbia University Professor, Andrei Serban, states:

"Maria Dinulescu is an extremely gifted actress with love for her craft and enthusiasm for her profession. I am impressed with her ardor and devotion to the classic roles as well as new characters she plays so charmingly on the big screen, which brought her impressive awards. Without hesitation I can declare that Maria Dinulescu is an outstanding actress with a skilled potential and upcoming career."

Guillermo Arriaga, Writer & Director, Cannes Palme d'Or Winner and Oscar Nominated, writes:

"She is an extraordinary actress with a bright future ahead of her due to her great talent.  She is sought after by several of the top directors for difficult roles. I am sure that Maria Dinulescu can bring many good things to the American cinema."

Filmography

 Far from here (2016)
 Smokers Die Slowly Together (2016)
 Selfie 69 (2016)
 Double (2016)
 Rollover (2014)
 Stepping Out (2013)
 The Ridicule (2013)
 Plongeur (2012) 
 Doina  (2010)
 Beyond America (2008)
 L'enfance d'Icare (2008)
 The Dot Man (2008)
 Hooked  (2008)
 Blood and Chocolate  (2007)
 California Dreamin' endless (2007)
 Examen (2006)
 Impasse (2005)
 Le tramway d'Andréa (2005)
 Gadjé (2005)
 Milionari de weekend (2004)
 Camera ascunsă (2004)
 Trafic (2004)
 Forme aberrante (2003)
 Green Oaks (2003)
 Poveste la scara C (2003)
 17 minute întârziere (2002)
 București-Wien, 8–15 (2000)

Series

 În derivã (2010)
 Păcatele Evei (2005)

External links
 www.mariadinulescu.com
 

Romanian actresses
Living people
Year of birth missing (living people)